Panagiotis Efthymiadis (born 12 April 1975) is a retired Greek football defender.

References

1975 births
Living people
Greek footballers
Pierikos F.C. players
SC Austria Lustenau players
Panegialios F.C. players
Panionios F.C. players
A.P.O. Akratitos Ano Liosia players
Paniliakos F.C. players
Proodeftiki F.C. players
Olympiacos Volos F.C. players
Eordaikos 2007 F.C. players
Veria F.C. players
Anagennisi Epanomi F.C. players
Achilleas Neokaisareia F.C. players
Vataniakos F.C. players
Super League Greece players
Austrian Football Bundesliga players
Association football defenders
Greek expatriate footballers
Expatriate footballers in Austria
Greek expatriate sportspeople in Austria
Footballers from Katerini